Hockey Algeria is the public name of the authority which governs both ice hockey, inline hockey and ball hockey in Algeria.

Hockey Algeria was founded in 2008 by Karim Kerbouche, Harond Litim and Nassim Boulakdem and was later accepted into the International Ice Hockey Federation (IIHF) on 26 September 2019. The goal was to unite hockey players of Algerian origin from around the world, and create an Algerian national team. Hockey Algeria is an associate member of the IIHF and therefore has no right to vote in the General Assembly. The current president of Hockey Algeria is Karim Kerbouche.

Ice hockey in Algeria

There is currently little ice hockey activity in Algeria. There is currently one club in Algeria, HC Alger Corsaires.
There is one real ice rink in Algeria and several synthetic ice rinks, with various levels of activity within them.

References

External links
IIHF profile
National Teams of Ice Hockey profile
Official website of Hockey Algeria 

Ice hockey governing bodies in Africa
Ice